{{DISPLAYTITLE:L2 Puppis}}

L2 Puppis (also known as HD 56096) is a giant star in the constellation of Puppis and is located between the bright stars Canopus and Sirius. It is a semi-regular pulsating star.

The designation L2 has a tangled history. This star and another were both labelled with "L" by Nicolas-Louis de Lacaille when he created the constellation Puppis within Argo Navis. The two stars were labelled as "1.L" and "2.L" by Johann Elert Bode in his star catalogue published in 1801. Later authors used L1 and L2, usually with numeric subscripts (i.e. L1 and L2), but occasionally as superscripts. The subscripted designation is now universally used where typography allows for subscripts.

L2 Puppis was discovered to be variable by Benjamin Apthorp Gould in 1872, and was listed in Uranometria Argentina as 73 G. Puppis with magnitude 5.10v. It has never been given a formal variable star designation, unlike L1 Puppis which is OU Puppis.

L2 Puppis varies in apparent magnitude by about two magnitudes with a period of 140 days. The average brightness also varies slowly over several years so that the total range is given as magnitude 2.6–6.0. Since 1995 the average brightness has dropped so that the 140-day variations are now between about magnitude 6 and 8. The variation in light may be caused by a combination of radial pulsations in the star's atmosphere and by dimming from circumstellar dust.

L2 Puppis is most likely an asymptotic giant branch star that has passed through the main sequence and is evolving to become a white dwarf.

Other calculations give higher masses, for example , and younger ages such as 1.5 billion years.

L2 Puppis has a visual 12th-magnitude companion.

References

Puppis
Semiregular variable stars
M-type giants
Puppis, L2
056096
Post-asymptotic-giant-branch stars
034922
2748
Emission-line stars
Durchmusterung objects
Puppis, 73